Maria Leonor Couceiro Pizarro Beleza GCC (born 23 November 1948), is a Portuguese politician.

Career
She is daughter of José Júlio Pizarro Beleza and Maria dos Prazeres Lançarote Couceiro da Costa. Her brother is former Minister of Finance Miguel Beleza.

Member of the Social Democratic Party, she served twice as Minister of Health in the Portuguese government. She is the 1st President of the Champalimaud Foundation.

Leonor Beleza is a graduate of the University of Lisbon Law School, where she has also worked as an assistant professor. During a distinguished professional career she has held a number of high-profile public offices. Among other positions, she was Secretary of State of the Presidency of the Cabinet (1982–1983), Secretary of State for Social Security (1983–1985), and Minister of Health (1985–1990) in the Portuguese Government. She has been elected as a Member of Parliament on several occasions and on two occasions she has served as Vice President of the Assembly of the Republic (1991–1994, 2002–2005). In addition to her prominent role in public affairs Mrs Beleza has also played an active role in the private sector.

Leonor Beleza is currently the Chairman of the Portuguese League for People with Physical Disabilities, chairman of the advisory board of the D. Pedro IV Foundation, and a member of the General Councils of the CEBI Foundation and of the Gil Foundation. She is also a vigorous campaigner for women's rights, a cause she has supported for many years. In 2004, Leonor Beleza was appointed Chairman of the Champalimaud Foundation by the will of António Champalimaud. Leonor Beleza headed the Banco Totta & Açores Supervisory Board (1995–1998) and member of the BCP's (Banco Comercial Português) General Council and Supervisory Board (2011–2013).

Marriage and issue
She married Diogo de Mendonça Rodrigues Tavares and had two children:
 Mariana da Conceição Beleza de Mendonça Tavares (born Lisbon, 4 December 1975); by Bernardo Maria Correia Mendes Pinheiro Torres (born Lisbon, 29 February 1976) she had one daughter Maria Beatriz Beleza Tavares Pinheiro Torres (born Lisbon, 13 October 1999)
 Miguel Couceiro Beleza de Mendonça Tavares (born 8 March 1979)

AIDS scandal
In 2001, a Portuguese court indicted Beleza propagating a contagious disease during her time as Health Minister during the 1980s. More than 100 Portuguese haemophiliacs had become infected with the AIDS virus after receiving transfusions of contaminated plasma that had been imported and distributed by the public health service, part of the larger worldwide contaminated haemophilia blood products scandal.

Honours

Portuguese National Honours 
  Grand-Cross of the Order of Christ, Portugal (9 June 2005)

Foreign Honours 
  Grand-Cross of the Order of the Falcon, Iceland (25 February 1994)

References

Living people
1948 births
Social Democratic Party (Portugal) politicians
Health ministers of Portugal
Contaminated haemophilia blood products
20th-century Portuguese women politicians
Women government ministers of Portugal